Sport Vereniging  Sport Boys (English:Sports Club) known as  SV Sport Boys or simply Sport Boys is an Aruban football club based in Santa Cruz/Angochi, that competes in the in Division Uno, the second tier of the Aruban football league.

Achievements

Aruban Division Uno: 1
1963–64
Torneo Copa Betico Croes: 1
2004–05
Koningin Juliana Beker (Copa Juliana): 1
1973

Players

Current squad
As of 10 September 2022

Current technical staff

External links
Official Website
Facebook page

References

SV Caiquetio